Guy F. Palumbo (born 1973) is an American politician and businessman who served in the Washington State Senate representing the 1st district. He resigned in May 2019 to take a position as a senior manager with Amazon. He was succeeded by Derek Stanford.

References

1973 births
Living people
Washington (state) state senators
21st-century American politicians